Nicholas Breakspear Catholic School (NBS) is a secondary school with academy status situated on the rural fringe of St Albans, an old Roman city in Hertfordshire, England.

The school takes its name from the 12th-century priest St Albans-born and educated Nicholas Breakspear, who, as Pope Adrian IV, is the only Englishman ever to have occupied the papal chair. The school makes an annual pilgrimage to his tomb in Rome.

Recent history 
After a 2008 renovation of the science classrooms, Chris Reeves made a nativity scene composed of sculptures made from the discarded 1960's desks.

In September 2013 the school celebrated its golden anniversary with a service offered by the Catholic Archbishop of Westminster at SS Alban and Stephen Church in the presence of the mayor of St Albans. The mass was followed by a tree-planting ceremony on the school grounds.

It was recently categorized in 2016 as a 'Good' school but still remains a school with below average teachers.

On 13 January 2016, Prince William ate lunch with Breakspear students at John Henry Newman School as he waited for paramedics. The East Anglian Air Ambulance, of which the Duke of Cambridge is part of, frequently uses the Newman School fields.

The student leaders' take part in a trip to Hoima and Kasambya in Uganda supporting a charity; Kiddies Support Scheme (KiSS) helping families become self-sufficient.  To date this team has led a school community to raise over £50000 for this charity.

House system 
Breakspear has six houses, each named after a saint whose life is intended to serve as an example to the community. Students are assigned to one of the houses on entrance to the school in Year 7 where they remain until the end of 6th form; whenever possible younger siblings become a member of the same house.

Each member of staff is also attached to a house.

Each house has two designated Year 11 House Captains, and one Sixth Form House Leader, who aides in coordinating house teams, organise activities and events and represent their house at relevant meetings. Houses compete between themselves for the most point accumulated during both terms of the school year.

List of houses 

 More House
 Soubirous House
 Lisieux House
 Kolbe House
 Bosco House
 Bakhita House

School staff

Notable faculty 

 Jonathan Collings - former teacher, later found out to be and convicted for child pornography offenses (ret. 2010).
 Norman Sofier - former history and careers teacher (1972-1995).
 Emma Westbury - Head of Religious Education.
 Mery John - former teacher, now Head of Stanborough School.

Notable alumni 

 Martin Brophy MBE - former chairman of the London Gay Men's Choir.
 Tom Cahill - musician, he played in the band Saving Aimee.
 Matthew Connolly - professional football player, he started his career at Arsenal and most notably played for Queens Park Rangers and Cardiff City.
 Satoshi Ishida - musician, he played in the band Saving Aimee.
 Nick Isiekwe - professional English rugby union player.
 Sean Lemon - musician, he played in the band Saving Aimee and is a member of the band Room 94.

References

Secondary schools in Hertfordshire
Schools in St Albans
Academies in Hertfordshire
Catholic secondary schools in the Archdiocese of Westminster
Educational institutions established in 1963
1963 establishments in England